Gruzdevsky is a rural locality (a settlement) in Kupriyanovskoye Rural Settlement, Gorokhovetsky District, Vladimir Oblast, Russia. The population was 18 as of 2010. There are 8 streets.

Geography 
Gruzdevsky is located on the Suvoroshch River, 19 km southeast of Gorokhovets (the district's administrative centre) by road. Lykshino is the nearest rural locality.

References 

Rural localities in Gorokhovetsky District